Mohammad Nahavandian (born 2 February 1954) is an Iranian politician and economist who served as the Vice President for Economic Affairs. He was formerly Chief of Staff of the President of Iran, serving from 2013 until 2017.

He is described as a "moderate, religious-minded veteran technocrat" with strong ties to the traditional bazaari class. He was reportedly on friendly terms with late Akbar Hashemi Rafsanjani, as well as Ali Larijani and Mahmoud Ahmadinejad.

Early life and education
Nahavandian is the son of Jafar Nahavandian, a famous Iranian religious figure and founder of Hossienieh Zanjaniha. He was born in 1954 in Tehran. He graduated from Alavi Institute in the early 1970s and started to study in Hawza. with a degree in economics and then moved to United States for education at George Washington University. He left the United States and returned to Iran before Iranian Revolution. He was one of the closest people to Morteza Motahari and Mohammad Javad Bahonar. He then founded Economic Council of Iran in 1980 but returned to the United States to continue his education. He received his Ph.D in economics in 1989 and founded Islamic Cooperation of the Americans. He returned to Iran after eight years in 1994.

Career
Nahavandian became deputy minister of commerce in 1981, having been appointed by Yahya Ale Eshaq and served in the capacity until 1983. Nahavandian was again appointed to the same office in 1993, and served until 2002, when he resigned from office to become Economic adviser to the President Mohammad Khatami.  After Ali Larijani was appointed as the Secretary of Supreme National Security Council, he named Nahavandian as his deputy in economic affairs. He was also choice of Mahmoud Ahmadinejad as the head of Tehran Stock Exchange (TSE) in 2006 but he rejected it to continue his career at the Security Council.

In December 2007, he was elected as the president of Iran Chamber of Commerce Industries and Mines. After resignation of long time president of the chamber Mohammad Reza Behzadian, Nahavandian was elected as his successor with 165 votes from representatives of cities and organizations and becomes president of the chamber.  but after the election of Hassan Rouhani, he was named as his economic adviser and head of economic commission for the transition affairs. It was reported that Nahavandian will become chief of staff of the president after the inauguration of Rouhani. After Rouhani took office as the President of Iran, he officially appointed Nahavandian for the position.

Works
“New Horizons in Trade Policy-Making”, Commerce Publishing Co., Tehran, 2002 
“Tobacco Conflict, Study of Iran-British Economic Relations in 19th Century”, Fajr Publications, Tehran, 1978

References

1954 births
Living people
People from Tehran
George Washington University alumni
Vice presidents of Iran for Economic Affairs
Iranian economists